Brian A. Wandell is the Isaac and Madeline Stein Family Professor at Stanford University, where he is Director of the Stanford Center for Cognitive and Neurobiological Imaging, and Deputy Director of the Wu Tsai Neuroscience Institute.
He was  a founding co-editor of the Annual Review of Vision Science.

Research
His work in visual neuroscience uses both functional MRI and computational modeling to understand the action of the visual portions of the brain. His laboratory has worked to develop methods for identifying and measuring visual field maps in visual cortex. Recently, he and members of the laboratory have  measured the reorganization of maps and cortical function following brain injury.

The Wandell lab is also studying human brain development. Specifically, they are measuring the responses in visual cortex of children, aged 8–12, as the children become skilled readers. He and his group are hoping to understand how visual signals and structures must develop to permit rapid, skilled reading. This work includes an array of techniques, including (functional MRI), diffusion tensor imaging (DTI), anatomical imaging, and behavioral testing.

Wandell authored the vision science textbook Foundations of Vision. He was elected to the National Academy of Sciences in 2003.

As Director of the Center for Cognitive and Neurobiological Imaging, Wandell has been an active advocate for making research data and algorithms available to the wider research community. According to Stanford, An overall effort of the Wandell lab involves sharing data and computational methods with the broader scientific community. This work, which was funded by a grant from the National Science Foundation, supports that effort by providing data and a complete implementation of the method through the Stanford Digital Repository and GitHub.

Along with Laurence Maloney, Wandell was awarded the National Academy of Sciences' Troland Research Award in 1987 "For their elegant account of how we preserve the inherent colors of surfaces despite wide variations in illumination, and of Wandell's other fundamental investigations of color vision."  In 2008, he received the Edgar D. Tillyer Award from The Optical Society.

References

External links
 Home page
 Stanford School of Medicine academic profile
 "Giving Sight to the Blind" video lecture by Brian Wandell
 Brian Wandell GitHub

Living people
Year of birth missing (living people)
American cognitive neuroscientists
Fellows of the Society of Experimental Psychologists
Members of the United States National Academy of Sciences
Stanford University Department of Psychology faculty
Scientists from California
Annual Reviews (publisher) editors